Bay Islands may refer to:

 Bay Islands Department, Honduras
 Southern Moreton Bay Islands, Queensland, Australia

See also
 Bay of Islands
 Bay of Isles
 Island Bay, Wellington
 Little Bay Islands